Tom Voltaire Okwalinga also known as  TVO  is an anonymous Ugandan and famous social media critique of the Uganda's government.
He has been leaking a series of the Uganda's government secrets through his Facebook account for which he has over 120,000 followers.

In April 2014, he posted a secret tape that implicated the Inspector General of Police (IGP) of the Uganda Police Force then, Kale Kayihura’s attempt to investigate and curtail Amama Mbabazi’s underneath campaign to oust President Museveni in the 2016 presidential elections.

No one knows the true identity of  TVO  including his many followers and Facebook refused to reveal his identity to the Uganda government.

References

Year of birth missing (living people)
Living people
People in information technology
Ugandan activists
Ugandan bloggers